Metropolitan Anthony (Bloom) of Sourozh
Benjamin (Fedchenkov)
Herman of Alaska
Patriarch Hermogenes
Innocent of Alaska
Macarius II
Nicholas of Japan
Stephen of Perm
Tikhon of Moscow
Mikhail Alexeyevich Miropiev
Daniel Sysoyev

Russian Orthodox Missionaries
Russian Orthodox Missionaries
Russian
Russian Orthodox Missionaries
Missionaries, Orthodox
Russian Orthodox